Luticola is a genus of marine diatoms.

References

Naviculales
Diatom genera